A..C..O (born February 3, 1977) is a Japanese singer. She made her debut in 1995 with the pop single . She is a part of Sony Music Japan. She explores different musical styles, with the albums Absolute Ego and Material displaying electronica influences. Absolute Ego was produced by ex-Denki Groove keyboardist, Yoshinori Sunahara and The Other Side of Absolute Ego album contains remixes by Tricky, DJ Krush, and Silent Poets.

In 2003, after a two-year hiatus, she enlisted the help of the avant-garde audio-visual performance group  for her quieter, more delicate album, Irony. AllMusic described Irony as "one of the most beautiful albums to come out of Japan in 2003", with the music compared to an "airy lullaby".

Discography

Studio albums
 1996: Kittenish Love
 1997: Nude
 1998: Lady Soul
 1999: Absolute Ego
 2001: Material
 2003: Irony
 2006: Mask
 2007: Aco Best: Girl's Diary
 2010: Devil's Hands
 2012: Luck
 2013: TRAD
 2015: Valentine

Remix albums
 2000: The Other Side of Absolute Ego

References

External links

 Official website 
 ACO on Twitter
 ACO on Facebook
 Official blog (Old)
 Official website (Old)
 Discography (Old)

1977 births
Japanese women pop singers
Japanese pop musicians
Ki/oon Music artists
Living people
Musicians from Aichi Prefecture
20th-century Japanese women singers
20th-century Japanese singers
21st-century Japanese women singers
21st-century Japanese singers